It's You and Me is the soundtrack album to the eponymous series. The soundtrack was released on June 27, 2007 by the record company Universal Music.

Background

Production 
The album was interpreted by Sheryl Rubio protagonist of the series, with the cast of the series. Also played by Victor Drija, Rosmeri Marval, Aran de las Casas and Gabriel Coronel. The album received mixed reviews from print media. The album was recorded during the filming of the first season of the television series. The lead single was "Somos tú y yo" released on June 27, 2007 with their official video, and subsequently published other singles from the album.

Released 
The album was released on June 27, 2007 by the record company Universal Music. The first single from the soundtrack was the song of the thematic series that names the same album, played by Sheryl Rubio and Victor Drija, but with the international launch of the series have been other versions like the Visayan version, with video, entitled "Ikaw ug Ako" (released on November 18, 2013), which is used as the opening theme in the Philippines and Indonesia, while in Italy the official theme of the opening credits is the original singing by Sheryl Rubio and Victor Drija.

The album is composed of 12 songs plus 3 additional versions performed by Sheryl Rubio and Víctor Drija, the lyrics of the songs on the album were written by Vladimir Perez, screenwriter Somos tú y yo. The album is available in record stores throughout Latin America and through iTunes and Spotify in Mexico and Argentina.

Track listing

Latin American edition

References 

2007 soundtrack albums
Television soundtracks